John Gunn Falconer (2 January 1902 –  1982) was a Scottish professional footballer who made over 200 appearances in the Scottish League for Cowdenbeath as a goalkeeper.

Career 
A goalkeeper, Falconer made 204 appearances in the top two divisions of Scottish football for Cowdenbeath in two spells between 1921 and 1928. While with the Fife club, he made one appearance for the Scottish League XI against the Football League XI in March 1928, but six months later his career appeared to have been ended when he sustained a broken kneecap.

He made a return to league football with Celtic in 1931 and was soon unexpectedly back in First Division action when he had to replace John Thomson, who had been fatally injured during a match. However, Joe Kennaway soon arrived at Celtic Park and after a period as his deputy, Falconer moved to Second Division club East Stirlingshire in 1933, where he played for one season.

Career statistics

Honours 

 Cowdenbeath Hall of Fame

References 

Scottish footballers
Cowdenbeath F.C. players
Scottish Football League players
Scottish Football League representative players
1902 births
1982 deaths
Association football goalkeepers
People from Govan
Celtic F.C. players
East Stirlingshire F.C. players
St Anthony's F.C. players
Stranraer F.C. players
Scottish Junior Football Association players